William O'Callaghan (1881 – 28 January 1967) was an Irish Fine Gael politician. He was the ninth child born to Catherine (née Donovan) and Cornelius O'Callaghan, farmers in Scarragh, Lombardstown, County Cork. He married Anna Sheahan and together they had four children. He bought Longueville House, Mallow in 1938.

He was a member of Seanad Éireann from 1938 to 1943 and from 1944 to 1961. A farmer, he was first elected to the Seanad in 1938 by the Agricultural Panel. He lost his seat at the 1943 election but was re-elected at the 1944 election. He did not contest the 1961 Seanad election.

He died on 28 January 1967 and is buried in St. Gobnait's Cemetery, Mallow, County Cork.

References

1881 births
1967 deaths
Irish farmers
Members of the 2nd Seanad
Members of the 3rd Seanad
Members of the 5th Seanad
Members of the 6th Seanad
Members of the 7th Seanad
Members of the 8th Seanad
Members of the 9th Seanad
Fine Gael senators